The 2015–16 Liga Nacional de Fútbol de Guatemala season was the 17th season in which the Apertura and Clausura season was used. The season began in 2015 and ended in 2016.

Format
The format for both championships are identical. Each championship will have two stages: a first stage and a playoff stage. The first stage of each championship is a double round-robin format. The teams that finish first and second in the standings will advance to the playoffs semifinals, while the teams that finish 3–6 will enter in the quarterfinals. The winner of each quarterfinal will advance to the semifinals. The winners of the semifinals will advance to the finals, which will determine the tournament champion.

Teams

Apertura
The 2015 Torneo Apertura began on 13 August 2015 and ended on 21 December 2015.

Personnel and sponsoring

Managerial changes

Beginning of the season

During the season

Standings

Results

Playoffs

Quarterfinals

First leg

Second leg 
{{Football box
|id="Comunicaciones v Petapa"
|date=
|time=13:00 UTC−6
|team1=Comunicaciones
|score= 3-0
|team2=Petapa
|report=
|goals1= Jose Contreras   Rolando Blackburn   Emiliano Lopez 
|goals2  =None|stadium=Estadio Cementos Progreso, Guatemala City
|attendance=
|referee=}}
Comunicaciones won 3–0 on aggregate.

1–1 on aggregate. Guastatoya advanced on the away goal rule.

 Semifinals 

 First leg 

 Second leg 

Guastatoya won 5–2 on aggregate.

Antigua GFC won 4-3 on aggregate.

 Finals 

 First leg 

 Second leg 

Antigua GFC won 3-2 on aggregate.

List of foreign players in the league
This is a list of foreign players in Apertura 2015. The following players:
have played at least one apertura game for the respective club.
have not been capped for the Guatemala national football team on any level, independently from the birthplace

A new rule was introduced a few season ago, that clubs can only have five foreign players per club and can only add a new player if there is an injury or player/s is released.Antigua GFC  Mandred Russell 
  Alexander Robinson
  Mekeil Williams
  Akeem Priestley
  Justin ArboledaCobán Imperial  Victor Guay 
  Argenis Fernandez
  Mario Piñeyro 
  Jesus Darwin RamirezCSD Comunicaciones    Joel Benítez
  Rolando Blackburn
  Agustín Herrera
  Jesús Jonathan Lozano
  Emiliano LopezGuastatoya    Victor Solalinde
  Agustín Arigon
  Álvaro García Deportivo Mictlan
  Juan Aguirre
  Marlon Negrete
  William Negrete
  Ricardo Romero

Deportivo Malacateco
  Martin Edwin Garcia
  Nestor Asprilla
  Juan Carlos Meza 
  Juan Carlos Silva
  Ricardo Rocha
  Jerrel Britto 

 (player released during the season)

Deportivo Marquense
 None

CSD Municipal 
  Johnny Woodly Lambert
  Carlos Hernández
  Keilor Soto
  Jaime Alas

Deportivo Petapa
  Minor Alvarez
  Lucas Trecarichi 
  Juan Lovato
  Adrian Apellaniz
  Ignacio Flores

CD Suchitepéquez
  Ángel Prudencio
  Shane Orio
  Jhon Cardona
  Jhon Jairo Córdoba 
  Luis Lobo

Universidad SC
  Paulo Centurion
  Jonathan Rodríguez Cuenu 
  Michel Rivera
  Carlos Kamiani 
  Alexis Egea

Club Xelajú MC
  Juliano Rangel de Andrade
  Juan Baena
  Brunet Hay

Clausura

The 2016 Torneo Clausura began on  2016 and will end in  2016.

Personnel and sponsoring

Managerial changes

Beginning of the season

During the season

Standings

Results

Playoffs

Quarterfinals

First leg

Second leg 

Comunicaciones won 4–3 on aggregate.

Malacateco won 3–2 on aggregate.

Semifinals

First leg

Second leg 

Suchitepéquez won 4–1 on aggregate.

Comunicaciones won 2-2 on aggregate.

Finals

First leg

Second leg 

 won – on aggregate.

Aggregate table

List of foreign players in the league
This is a list of foreign players in Clausura 2016. The following players:
have played at least one apertura game for the respective club.
have not been capped for the Guatemala national football team on any level, independently from the birthplace

A new rule was introduced a few season ago, that clubs can only have five foreign players per club and can only add a new player if there is an injury or player/s is released.

Antigua GFC
  Mandred Russell 
  Alexander Robinson
  Mekeil Williams
  Agustín Herrera
  Justin Arboleda

Cobán Imperial
  Arnulfo Beitar
  Victor Guay 
  Mario Piñeyro

CSD Comunicaciones
  Juan Barrera
  Joel Benítez
  Rolando Blackburn
  Emiliano Lopez

Guastatoya
  Orlando Moreira
  Víctor Solalinde
  Álvaro García

 Deportivo Mictlan
  Juan Aguirre
  Marlon Negrete
  William Negrete
  Ricardo Romero

Deportivo Malacateco
  Juan Carlos Meza
  Jhon Jairo Palacios
  Carlos Díaz 
  Ricardo Rocha

 (player released during the season)

Deportivo Marquense
  Matías Triofini

CSD Municipal 
  Janderson Pereira
  Jaime Alas
  Gastón Puerari
  Keylor Soto

Deportivo Petapa
  Juan Lovato
  Adrian Apellaniz
  Matías Quinteros

CD Suchitepéquez
  Francisco Ladogana 
  Mauricio Gerni 
  Omar Salazar
  David Monsalve

Universidad SC
  Guillermo Chavasco 
  Rafael Burgos
  Michel Rivera
  Carlos Kamiani

Club Xelajú MC
  Cristhian Lagos
  Juliano Rangel de Andrade
  Juan Baena
  José Mendoza

References

External links
 http://www.prensalibre.com/Deportes/FutbolNacional
 https://web.archive.org/web/20150813211930/http://lared.com.gt/pages/sec_noticia/113

Liga Nacional de Fútbol de Guatemala seasons
1
Guatemala